Sylvie Granger (1955 – 12 June 2022) was a French modernist historian. She gained notoriety for her works on music and dance of the 18th century.

Biography
Granger studied under historian  and defended her thesis on 15 February 1997. She became a research assistant at Le Mans University and taught a course titled "Dance and Society from the 16th to the 19th century". She continued her position as a research assistant until her retirement from teaching in 2016, although continued her activities in research. She was a member of the Temos laboratory.

Granger died on 12 June 2022.

Works
Musiciens dans la ville, 1600-1850 (2002)
Journal d’un chanoine du Mans, Nepveu de La Manouillère, 1759-1807 (2013)
Musiciennes en duo, Mères, filles, sœurs ou compagnes d’artistes (2015)
Femmes en Sarthe, Actrices de leur temps (2015)
Hommes en Sarthe, Acteurs de leur temps (2015)
Souvenirs d'un villageois du Maine, Louis Simon (1741-1820) (2016)
Jardins d’émotions en Sarthe (2017)
Danser dans la France des Lumières (2019)

References

1955 births
2022 deaths
20th-century French historians
21st-century French historians
French women historians
University of Lyon alumni
Aix-Marseille University alumni